"Entirely Beloved" is the second episode of the BBC Two series Wolf Hall. It was first broadcast on 28 January 2015.

Plot summary

In December 1529, following Cardinal Thomas Wolsey's departure as Lord Chancellor, Thomas Cromwell gains favor from King Henry VIII and is sworn into the king's Privy Council.

Cast

Critical reception
"Entirely Beloved" received positive reviews. The Daily Telegraph again gave the episode 5/5; Reviewer Jasper Reeves also praised Straughan's dialogue and Peter Kosminsky's directing, writing, "It's like watching a chess grandmaster go around a room playing 20 challengers at once. The spectacle is dizzying, and the acting magnificent."

Neela Debnath, writing for The Independent, compared the intrigue and scheming in Wolf Hall to that of Game of Thrones, writing, "Game of Thrones fans tuning in to watch Wolf Hall might notice similarities between the politicking in King's Landing and Henry VIII's court – and they wouldn't be wrong." Debnath praised the lead actor, writing, "Rylance continues to mesmerize as the man of questionable birth rising to become the king's right-hand man. His calm, collected and measured performance really has the audience rooting for him."

In his review for The Guardian, John Sutherland praised writer Peter Straughan, who wrote the teleplay based on Hilary Mantel's original book: "Straughan ... has been commendably faithful to Mantel while infusing new televisual life into the narrative.

References

External links
 
"Entirely Beloved" at the BBC

Wolf Hall (miniseries) episodes
2015 British television episodes
Cultural depictions of Henry VIII
Cultural depictions of Anne Boleyn
Fiction set in 1529